The Lincoln MKR concept car was a premium 4-door fastback sedan design, as introduced during the 2007 North American International Auto Show by Lincoln. Its chassis was based on the Ford D2C platform as used in the Ford Mustang.  The MKR signaled the next-generation of premium Lincoln vehicles, introducing the new TwinForce engine family and a restyled "bow wave" waterfall grill.  The concept car was first unveiled to the media and the public in a press release on 1 January 2007.

Concept

The Lincoln concept featured an independent rear suspension, with MacPherson struts up front. The engine selected for the MKR concept introduced the new generation of Ford twin-turbocharged engines.

The interior design included environmentally-friendly and renewable materials, such as cashmere leather, oak instrument panel engineered from recycled wood, mohair carpet, and seat cushion foam made from soy.   The concept car also featured the THX II-certified car audio system.

The Lincoln MKR concept was introduced along with what became Lincoln's flagship sedan, the Lincoln MKS.  The MKR represented a full expression of Lincoln's future design strategy, which included seven primary design features:
 Clean and uncluttered body surfaces
 High beltlines
 Rear suicide doors are easy for passengers to access
 Chamfered surfaces which run parallel to the beltline
 Twin-port “bow-wave” double-wing front grille - inspired by the 1941 Lincoln Continental Cabriolet
 Thin horizontal headlights, and thin LED tailamps that run the width of the vehicle
 Thick C-pillar that smoothly transitions into the cantilevered roof
 Pronounced cantrail / roofrails

Special Projects Inc., located in Plymouth, Michigan, was hired to be responsible for the building of the MKR. Special Projects has built many other concept vehicles for Ford including Ford 427, Ford Super Chief, Ford Flex, and Lincoln Blackwood.

Production intent

To date, Ford has not announced a production version of the MKR, although many of the concept's design themes and features were adopted for the production Lincoln MKS, MKZ, MKX, and MKT vehicles, starting with the 2009 model year MKS, 2010 for the MKZ and MKT, and 2011 for the MKX.  The Lincoln C concept also shares design themes with the MKR, in a smaller compact platform.  If the MKR had been approved, as an all new vehicle it would have likely been scheduled to launch around the 2011 time frame, most likely having been assembled at Flat Rock Assembly Plant in Flat Rock, Michigan alongside the Mustang, with which it would have shared a platform.

Specifications

Powertrain:  3.5-liter V-6 TwinForce engine -  / 
Chassis Dimensions:
Overall length:  .
Wheelbase:  .
Overall width:  .
Overall height at curb:  .
Front track width:  .
Rear track width:  .
Brakes:  Brembo power 4-wheel disc with ABS and traction control system
Front Suspension:  MacPherson struts with rear-facing L-shaped lower control arms and stabilizer bar
Rear Suspension:  Independent rear suspension
Interior:
Front headroom:  .
Rear headroom:  .
Front legroom:  .
Rear legroom:  .
Luggage capacity:

References

External links
Ford Motor Company press release on the Lincoln MKR from Media.Ford.com
Additional fair use candidate image from Ford press kit - Media.Ford.com
Motor Trend description of Lincoln MKR
Lincoln MKR description from Edmunds.com
Ford Motor Company press release on the TwinForce concept engine family

Cars introduced in 2007
Rear-wheel-drive vehicles
Mid-size cars
Luxury vehicles
Sports sedans
MKR